François Bourassa (born 26 September 1959, in Montreal) is a jazz pianist from Quebec. He is the son of Robert Bourassa.

His music is influenced by pianists such as Thelonious Monk, Brad Mehldau, and Chick Corea, as well as art music from the Classical and Romantic eras.

Awards
1985 - Winner of the Festival de jazz de Montréal contest.
2001, 2002 - Juno Award for Contemporary Jazz Album of the Year
2004 - Prix Opus, concert of the year
2004 - Prix Opus, concert of the year (jazz/world music)
2004 - Prix Félix, jazz album of the year
2007 - Prix Oscar Peterson from the Montreal International Jazz Festival

References

Canadian jazz pianists
Musicians from Montreal
Living people
1959 births
Juno Award for Contemporary Jazz Album of the Year winners
21st-century Canadian pianists